The men's featherweight event was part of the weightlifting programme at the 1924 Summer Olympics. The weight class was the lightest contested, and allowed weightlifters of up to 60 kilograms (132 pounds). The competition was held on 21 July 1924.

Results

One hand snatch

One hand clean & jerk

Press

Two hand snatch

Two hand clean & jerk

Final standing after the last event:

References

Sources
 official report
 

Featherweight